Ramcharan Madarilal Dohre was an Indian politician, social worker and Member of Parliament of 6th Lok Sabha of Uttar Pradesh, India.

References 

1942 births
Living people